Sofu Mehmed Pasha (died August 1649), also known as Mevlevi Mehmed Pasha, was an Ottoman statesman who served as grand vizier and defterdar (finance minister).

Early years 
He was a chamberlain/deputy (kethüda) of a defterdar (the head of the treasury). During the reign of Murad IV in 1636, he was appointed as the defterdar and served until 1639. During his retirement, he became a member of Mevlevi Order gaining the title Mevlevi or Sofu. During the turbulent events taking place just before the dethronement of Ibrahim in 1648, the previous grand vizier Hezarpare Ahmet Pasha had been lynched by an angry mob, and the Janissary leaders forced the sultan to appoint Sofu Mehmed Pasha as the grand vizier. The sultan reluctantly agreed  on 8 August 1648. Nevertheless, the sultan was dethroned five days after his appointment. Despite this dethronement, Sofu Mehmed Pasha was still afraid of the former sultan, as there was a possibility of the Janissaries re-enthroning him. To Sofu Mehmed Pasha's relief, Ibrahim was executed ten days after his dethronement. Sofu Mehmed Pasha is thought to have been personally present during the execution.

Grand Vizierate 
The new sultan Mehmed IV was only 7 years old and the queen regent Kösem Sultan (Ibrahim's mother and Mehmed's grandmother) was suspicious of Sofu Mehmed because of his role in the execution of Ibrahim. Another problem for Sofu Mehmed was the economy. His top priority in the government was the treasury. He limited expenditures, but this policy caused reactions among the sipahi troops, leading them to revolt. Sofu Mehmed saved his life by taking refuge behind the power of the Janissary troops. Although this saved his life, the Janissaries gained an excess of power from the incident, and soon, the commander of the Janissary Kara Murat Pasha took sides against Sofu Mehmed. The defeat of the Ottoman navy in the Battle of Focchies on 12 May 1649 was a further blow to Sofu Mehmed Pasha.

Death 
On 21 May 1649, he was replaced by Kara Murat Pasha. He was exiled to Malkara (a town in European Turkey), and soon, Kara Murat Pasha had him executed there in August 1649.

See also 
 List of Ottoman Grand Viziers
 List of Ottoman Ministers of Finance

References

17th-century Grand Viziers of the Ottoman Empire
Pashas
Defterdar
Executed people from the Ottoman Empire
1649 deaths
17th-century executions by the Ottoman Empire
Year of birth unknown
Ottoman governors of Damascus
Turks from the Ottoman Empire